Robert Julius Myers (October 31, 1912 – February 13, 2010) was an American actuary who co-created the American Social Security program. He also set the retirement age in the United States at 65 years old.

Myers was born in Lancaster, Pennsylvania, on October 31, 1912, to parents, Laurence B. Myers and Edith Hirsh Myers. He received his bachelor's degree from Lehigh University.
In 1963 he was elected as a Fellow of the American Statistical Association.

Myers died from respiratory failure at his home in Silver Spring, Maryland, at the age of 97.

References

External links

1912 births
2010 deaths
American actuaries
Social security in the United States
Lehigh University alumni
University of Iowa alumni
People from Lancaster, Pennsylvania
People from Philadelphia
People from Silver Spring, Maryland
People from Washington, D.C.
People from Cheltenham, Pennsylvania
Fellows of the American Statistical Association